Roy Lønhøiden (born in Kongsvinger, Norway, on 4 May 1964) is a Norwegian composer and singer-songwriter in the country music genre. His music is considered a blend of traditional Norwegian folk and American roots music.

Biography 
Lønhøiden was born in Finnskogen and grew up near Lake Vingersjøen by the district of Langeland in Kongsvinger. His mother and grandparents were in the Pentecostal church and would often perform for prisoners with her congregation.

He formed a group with Kristin Solli Schøien called Peyton Place in 1994 and they received an offer for a contract with Sony Music. Despite this, Lønhøiden decided to travel to the United States in 1995, where he lived with relatives and friends. He is influenced by Hank Williams, Johnny Cash, and Townes Van Zandt and although he returned to Norway after a year, he has been back to visit the US multiple times.

Lønhøiden then started a solo career, being nominated for Spellemannprisen (considered the Norwegian equivalent of a Grammy Award) for three of his albums, Sanger fra skogen (2006), Når dagen demrer blått (2008), and Du spør meg om sannhet (2015).

In 2015 he moved to Sweden.

In 2021 Lønhøiden was entangled in legal trouble when he tried to cross the Norwegian–Swedish border and inadvertently violated Norwegian COVID-19 regulations.

Discography

Albums
Solo albums
2004: Det ensomme landet
2006: Sanger fra skogen
2008: Når dagen demrer blått
2012: Sanger fra veien
2015: "Du spør meg om sannhet"
Collaborative albums
1994: Peyton Place with Kristin Solli Schøien 
1998: Kulseth & Lønhøiden Almenning with Stein and Bjørn Kulseth
2004: Fattige var de som først fikk se with Veronica Akselsen
Compilation albums
1995: Huset – 13 år på nåde
1998: Markens gang
2005: That´s Hillbilly
2005: Dansbare Takras og andre lekkerbiskener
2007: Pay Me My Money Down – The Bluegrass Album
2007: Cowboy & Indianer Sessions Vol. 1
2008: Norsk visesang i 50 år (3CD)

Video (DVD-VHS)
1992: Tell Me I'm Your Choice
1994: Song for the Roses with Peyton Place
2004: En fin kveld å leve
2006: Til jeg kan reise meg igjen

EPs
1994: Song for the Roses with Peyton Place

Singles
1994: "Fool for Love" with Peyton Place
1994: "Song for the Roses" with Peyton Place
2004: "Kjære vakre vene"
2008: "Vann og ved"
2012: "Veien til Savona"

References

External links
Last.fm

1964 births
Living people
Norwegian male singers
Norwegian songwriters
Musicians from Kongsvinger